The Washburn Ichabods football team, representing Washburn University, has had 5 players selected in the National Football League (NFL) since the league began holding drafts in 1936). This includes two players selected in the last decade. The New York Giants lead all NFL teams by drafting three Ichabods.

Each NFL franchise seeks to add new players through the annual NFL Draft. The draft rules were last updated in 2009. The team with the worst record from the previous year picks first, the next-worst team second, and so on. Teams that did not make the playoffs are ordered by their regular-season record with any remaining ties broken by strength of schedule. Playoff participants are sequenced after non-playoff teams, based on their round of elimination (wild card, division, conference, and Super Bowl).

Key

Players selected

References
General

 
 

Specific

Washburn
 
Washburn Ichabods NFL Draft